Fructose 6-phosphate (sometimes called the Neuberg ester) is a derivative of fructose, which has been phosphorylated at the 6-hydroxy group. It is one of several possible fructosephosphates. The β-D-form of this compound is very common in cells. The great majority of glucose is converted to fructose 6-phosphate upon entering a cell. Fructose is predominantly converted to fructose 1-phosphate by fructokinase following cellular import.

History
The name Neuberg ester comes from the German biochemist Carl Neuberg.  In 1918, he found that the compound (later identified as fructose 6-phosphate) was produced by mild acid hydrolysis of fructose 2,6-bisphosphate.

In glycolysis

Fructose 6-phosphate lies within the glycolysis metabolic pathway and is produced by isomerisation of glucose 6-phosphate. It is in turn further phosphorylated to fructose-1,6-bisphosphate.

See also
 Mannose phosphate isomerase

References

Monosaccharide derivatives
Organophosphates
Phosphate esters
Glycolysis